The manga Captain Tsubasa Road to 2002 is a sequel to Yōichi Takahashi's Captain Tsubasa series. The series follows Tsubasa Oozora, a soccer player who moves from São Paulo (Brancos in the anime) to Barcelona (Catalunya in the anime). 

The manga was published by Shueisha in the seinen manga magazine Weekly Young Jump and collected in fifteen tankōbon volumes between June 2001 and August 19, 2004. Studio Comet adapted the series into an anime series simply titled Captain Tsubasa that aired on TV Tokyo between October 7, 2001 and October 6, 2002.

Volume list

References

Road to 2002